Milici, Milići, or Miliči may refer to the following places:

 Milici, Italy
 Milići, Republika Srpska, Bosnia and Herzegovina
 Milići (Banovići), Bosnia and Herzegovina
 Milići (Sjenica), Serbia
 Miliči, Slovenia

See also

 Milic (disambiguation)